Ağzıbüyük can refer to:

 Ağzıbüyük, Çankırı
 Ağzıbüyük, Yüreğir